Cloria Conway Brown (née Richey; May 29, 1942 – March 18, 2018) was an American politician.

Brown was born in Manila, Arkansas. She received her bachelor's degree in informational systems from Washington University in St. Louis. Brown worked as an executive and soft tech manager. She was a member of the Missouri House of Representatives, having served one term from 2011 to 2013, and two terms from 2015 until her death. She was a member of the Republican Party.

Death
Brown died from cancer on March 18, 2018. She is survived by  her daughter, Mrs. Cathy Fiedler; her granddaughter, Ally Keaton; and her sister, Jackie.

Electoral history

State Representative

References

1942 births
2018 deaths
People from Manila, Arkansas
People from St. Louis County, Missouri
Washington University in St. Louis alumni
Women state legislators in Missouri
Republican Party members of the Missouri House of Representatives
Deaths from cancer in Missouri
21st-century American politicians
21st-century American women politicians
Place of death missing